John Gordon was a Scotland international rugby football player.

Rugby Union career

Amateur career

He played for Edinburgh Academicals.

International career

He was capped 3 times for Scotland beginning 8 March 1875.

References

1849 births
1934 deaths
Edinburgh Academicals rugby union players
Rugby union halfbacks
Rugby union players from Clerkenwell
Scotland international rugby union players
Scottish rugby union players